Rocksteady is the ninth studio album from Big Head Todd and The Monsters, released on July 20, 2010. The album's first single, "Beautiful", charted top 20 in Adult album alternative in 2010 and is available on iTunes. Glide Magazines Doug Collette called the album "fresh in ways even the band might not expect" and the band "right in their element from the opening title track".

Track listing

References

2010 albums
Big Head Todd and the Monsters albums